The Associação Académica de Coimbra – Organismo Autónomo de Futebol (AAC-OAF), also referred to as Académica de Coimbra or simply Académica, is a professional football club based in Coimbra, Portugal. As of the 2022-2023 football season in Portugal, the club competes in the third division of the Portuguese football league system, and hosts home games at the Estádio Cidade de Coimbra. It also has a futsal department with men's and women's teams. The club's name derives from the footballing division of the Associação Académica de Coimbra, officially known as the Associação Académica de Coimbra - Secção de Futebol (AAC-SF), which fields its own amateur football teams and belongs to the student association of the University of Coimbra like the professional AAC-OAF which is however an autonomous organization inside the student association.

The club was created in 1887, when Clube Atlético de Coimbra (founded in 1861) and Academia Dramática (founded in 1837) merged. The club have won the Taça de Portugal twice, in 1938–39 and 2011–12. In 1966–67, they achieved their highest position of runner-up in the Primeira Liga table.

History
Académica de Coimbra was founded on 3 November 1887. In honour of their 130th birthday, they joined the Club of Pioneers.

The Associação Académica de Coimbra - Organismo Autónomo de Futebol, hereinafter AAC-OAF, which dates back to November 3, 1887, the date of creation of the Associação Académica de Coimbra (AAC), is the legal and legitimate successor of the extinct Section of Football of the Association Académica de Coimbra (Associação Académica de Coimbra - Secção de Futebol (AAC-SF)) that, by resolution of June 10, 1974 of the General Assembly of Members of AAC after the events of the Carnation Revolution, was transformed into Clube Académico de Coimbra (CAC). The current name, AAC-OAF, was adopted on the joint initiative of the General Board of Academica de Coimbra (Direcção-Geral da Associação Académica de Coimbra (DG-AAC)) and the Board of the Academic Club of Coimbra (Clube Académico de Coimbra (CAC)), and it was approved by the General Board of Associação Académica de Coimbra (AAC) and by the General Assembly of CAC in 1984. By these statutes, a legally-binding link to the student association AAC and its university, the University of Coimbra (UC), was preserved in favour of AAC-OAF. The Associação Académica de Coimbra - Secção de Futebol (AAC-SF), amateur varsity football team which plays in the lowest non-professional regional football leagues, was reinstated some time later and has been in operation as a student-only football team of AAC.

Académica de Coimbra won the 1938–39 Taça de Portugal, the inaugural staging of the competition; they defeated S.L. Benfica 4–3 in the final. In 1966–67, the club finished as Primeira Liga runners-up to Benfica (best-ever finish), and lost the cup final 3–2 after extra time to Vitória de Setúbal. Two years later, a cup-final defeat to Benfica meant that the team competed in Europe for the first time, entering the 1969–70 Cup Winners' Cup and losing in the quarter-finals to eventual champions Manchester City via a single extra-time goal.

Académica de Coimbra moved frequently between the top two divisions in the years that followed. Under João Alves, they ended a three-year exile by winning promotion in 2001–02 as runners-up to Moreirense FC. Following a decade of almost exclusively bottom-half finishes, the team won its first silverware in 73 years when they took the cup in 2012, Marinho scoring the only goal after four minutes against Sporting CP. This allowed them entry into the group stage of the UEFA Europa League – a first European campaign in 30 years. Eliminated in third place in the group, they managed one win, 2–0 at home to holders Atlético Madrid with a brace from Wilson Eduardo.

A fourteen-year spell in the top division ended for Académica de Coimbra in 2015–16, when they finished in last place.

After the 2021-22 Liga Portugal 2 season, the club was relegated for the first time to the third tier of the Portuguese football pyramid.

Grounds

Their home ground is the Estádio Cidade de Coimbra, which has a capacity of 29,622.

Honours

I Liga/I Divisão
Runners-up (1): 1966–67
Taça de Portugal
Winners: 1938–39, 2011–12
Runners-up (3): 1950–51, 1966–67, 1968–69
Supertaça Cândido de Oliveira
Runners-up (1): 2012
Campeonato de Portugal
Runners-up (1): 1922–23
II Divisão
Winners: 1948–49, 1972–73

League and cup history

Note

Players

Current squad

Out on loan

Records and statistics

Most appearances
Competitive, professional matches only, appearances as substitute included in total.

Most goals
Competitive, professional matches only, appearances as substitute included in total.

Coaches

 Artur Jorge (16 December 2002 – 28 August 2003)
 Vítor Oliveira (29 August 2003 – 26 January 2004)
 João Carlos Pereira (1 February 2004 – 22 December 2004)
 Nelo Vingada (23 December 2004 – 6 May 2006)
 Manuel Machado (15 May 2006 – 10 September 2007)
 Domingos Paciência (12 September 2007 – 31 May 2009)
 Rogério Gonçalves (9 June 2009 – 4 October 2009)
 André Villas-Boas (14 October 2009 – 2 June 2010)
 Jorge Costa (8 June 2010 – 21 December 2010)
 José Guilherme (26 December 2010 – 21 February 2011)
 Ulisses Morais (23 February 2011 – 17 May 2011)
 Pedro Emanuel (14 June 2011 – 7 April 2013)
 Sérgio Conceição (8 April 2013 – 26 May 2014)
 Paulo Sérgio (2 June 2014 – 15 February 2015)
 José Viterbo (16 February 2015 – 20 September 2015)
 Filipe Gouveia (24 September 2015 – 31 May 2016)
 Costinha (20 June 2016 – 21 May 2017)
 Ivo Vieira (30 May 2017 – 13 November 2017)
 Ricardo Soares (14 November 2017 – 31 March 2018)
 Quim Machado (1 April 2018 – 13 May 2018)
 Carlos Pinto (30 May 2018 – 1 October 2018)
 João Alves (10 October 2018 – 31 May 2019)
 César Peixoto (19 June 2019 – 14 November 2019)
 João Carlos Pereira (18 November 2019 – 10 July 2020)
 Rui Borges (11 July 2020 – 22 September 2021)
 João Carlos Pereira (22 September 2021 – 21 November 2021)
 Pedro Duarte (25 November 2021 – 3 March 2022)
 José Gomes (4 March 2022 – 14 May 2022)

References

External links

 

 
Football
Sport in Coimbra
Taça de Portugal winners
Association football clubs established in 1887
University and college association football clubs
1887 establishments in Portugal
Primeira Liga clubs
Liga Portugal 2 clubs
Football clubs in Portugal